W. H. Malcolm Ltd (trading as the Malcolm Group) is a logistics company based in Linwood, Renfrewshire, Scotland. The company provides logistic services (Malcolm Logistics and Malcolm Rail) including road and rail transport, warehousing, and terminal management. Other group activities include civil engineering, plant hire, construction (Malcolm Construction), primarily groundwork and vehicle maintenance.

History 
The origins of the company trace to the 1920s, when Donald Malcolm left school in his early teenage years and started running his family's small coal business. The business grew and in the 1950s entered a partnership with Grampian Holdings; the company expanded into the road building through an equipment hire business, and a shale bing business.

In 1960, when the company was acquired by the industrial holding company Grampian Holdings Plc, the company's assets included 37 vehicles and seven construction equipment items. Donald Malcolm remained in charge of W H Malcolm after the takeover. Donald Malcolm died in 2003; two of his sons Walter and Andrew took over management of the business.

In 2002 Grampian Holdings Plc which was public listed on the stock exchange, was renamed The Malcolm Group Plc. In 2005 the company was taken back into private ownership by the Malcolm family and the Bank of Scotland plc.

Donald Malcolm Heritage Centre 
The Donald Malcolm Heritage Centre was built by Andrew Malcolm in memory of his father, Donald Malcolm. The centre houses a display of fifteen fully operational trucks. The centre is located next to the HQ in Linwood.

Divisions

Logistics 
The group provides warehousing at locations in Scotland, and northern and central England, primary and secondary road distribution, and train services in association with DB Cargo UK as well as managing the rail terminals at Grangemouth, Linwood (Elderslie) and Daventry International Rail Freight Terminal.

Rail 
The group's rail division was launched in 2001, which they use for delivery of goods to manufacturers.

Construction 
The company's construction division undertakes civil engineering work including excavation and construction of earthworks, roadwork and groundwork, waste recycling, quarrying, and sports pitch surfacing in association with Newark based subsidiary companies Charles Lawrence Surfaces Ltd and Woodholme Construction.

Vehicle maintenance is carried out in house.

References

External links

 Malcolm Group Official Website

Logistics companies of the United Kingdom
Transport companies of Scotland
Companies based in Renfrewshire
Transport companies established in 1960
1960 establishments in Scotland